"Show Girl" is a song by Slimmy, released in 2008 as the second single from his debut album Beatsound Loverboy. The song peaked at number 44 in the Portugal Singles Chart.
"Showgirl" is part of the soundtrack of the Portuguese TV series "Rebelde Way".

Background
"Show Girl", also written by Slimmy and produced by Quico Serrano and Mark Turner, was released to MySpace as the second single of the album on the same day "Beatsound Loverboy" was released and was released as a digital single on May 26, 2008. It premiered on the Antena 3 radio station on the same day. "Showgirl" together with the song "Bloodshot Star" is part of the soundtrack of the Portuguese TV series "Rebelde Way".

Music video

The video starts with six girls "coming out" from a curtain like they were entering on stage. Than, we can see Slimmy in a black background walking towards us while singing to the song. Next to him there are two girls kissing each other. The video is followed by a scene where we can see Slimmy performing in a nightclub while the girls, in featured in the opening scene of the video, are dancing to the song. This scene is alternated with a scene where Slimmy is singing the song in a white background with CDs stuck in the wall. Apart from girls, we can also see travesties in the video. The rest of the video features scenes from the performance in the nightclub.

Chart performance
The song entered at number 44 on the Portugal Singles Top 50 where it stayed for one week and peaked at number 44 where it stayed for more one week.

Live performances
 Sex and Love Tour
 A Very Slimmy Tour
 Be Someone Else Tour

Track listing
MySpace promotional single
"Show Girl" (album version) - 3:14

Digital single
"Show Girl" (album version) - 3:14

Personnel
Taken from the album's booklet.

Paulo Fernandes – main vocals, guitar
Paulo Garim – bass
Tó-Zé – drums

Release history

Charts

References

External links
Official music video at YouTube.
Lyrics of this song - Show Girl

2008 singles
English-language Portuguese songs
2007 songs